The Amanda Blake Store is a historic building located in Port Republic, New Jersey. It was built in 1884 as a general store and was added to the National Register of Historic Places on January 25, 1979 by which time it had been converted into a house.

References

National Register of Historic Places in Atlantic County, New Jersey
Commercial buildings completed in 1884
New Jersey Register of Historic Places
Port Republic, New Jersey
Houses in Camden County, New Jersey
1884 establishments in New Jersey
Retail buildings in New Jersey